The 2019–20 Greek Football Cup is the 78th season of the Greek Football Cup. A total of 84 clubs are accepted to enter. 14 from the Super League 1 (1st tier), 12 from the Super League 2 (2nd tier), 14 from the Football League (3rd tier) and 44 previous season local Cup winners. The Second Leg Semi-Final matches and the Final were postponed due to the COVID-19 pandemic in Greece until June.

The Final was originally scheduled for 26 July and was postponed to 30 August because of Olympiacos' pressure in HFF to change the stadium from Georgios Kamaras Stadium to Olympic Stadium and after the no of the Hellenic Police in the first stadium. The Final was rescheduled for 30 August in the Olympic Stadium but it was postponed again because Olympiacos' player Maximiliano Lovera was tested positive for COVID-19. The Final was rescheduled again for 12 September at Panthessaliko Stadium in Volos.

Calendar

Participating clubs

Qualifying rounds

First round
The draw for this round took place on 9 August 2019. The majority of fixtures were held on 24, 25 and 28 August 2019.

Two of the fixtures, Kalamata–Atromitos Patras and Enosis Vathyllos-Pansamiakos–Aiolikos were postponed in light the bids of Kalamata and Aiolikos to enter the Football League. Kalamata were eventually greenlighted to play in the Football League by decision of the HFF, taking the place of Nestos Chrysoupoli, who withdrew their participation. As such, despite being drawn against Atromitos Patras, they advanced to the Third Round draw on walkover. Likewise, Atromitos advanced to the next round on walkover.

Summary

|-
|colspan="3" style="background-color:#D0D0D0" align=center|24 August 2019

|-
|colspan="3" style="background-color:#D0D0D0" align=center|25 August 2019

|-
|colspan="3" style="background-color:#D0D0D0" align=center|28 August 2019

|-
|colspan="3" style="background-color:#D0D0D0" align=center|17 September 2019

|-
|colspan="3" style="background-color:#D0D0D0" align=center|N/A

|}

Matches

Second round
The draw for this round took place on 27 August 2018.

Summary

|-
|colspan="3" style="background-color:#D0D0D0" align=center|31 August 2019

|-
|colspan="3" style="background-color:#D0D0D0" align=center|1 September 2019

|-
|colspan="3" style="background-color:#D0D0D0" align=center|4 September 2019

|-
|colspan="3" style="background-color:#D0D0D0" align=center|8 September 2019

|-
|colspan="3" style="background-color:#D0D0D0" align=center|15 September 2019

|-
|colspan="3" style="background-color:#D0D0D0" align=center|2 October 2019

|}

Matches

Third round
The draw for this round took place on 9 September 2019. A total of 24 teams are involved in the Round 3 draw: The 12 2019−20 Football League teams entering in this round, and the twelve winners of the previous round.
12 single-match fixtures were determined, of which the winners will qualify to the next Round. The majority of fixtures were held on 14, 15 and 18 September.

Summary

|colspan="3" style="background-color:#D0D0D0" align=center|14 September 2019
|-

|-
|colspan="3" style="background-color:#D0D0D0" align=center|15 September 2019

|-
|colspan="3" style="background-color:#D0D0D0" align=center|18 September 2019

|-
|colspan="3" style="background-color:#D0D0D0" align=center|25 September 2019

|-
|colspan="3" style="background-color:#D0D0D0" align=center|16 October 2019

|-
|colspan="3" style="background-color:#D0D0D0" align=center|N/A

|}

Matches

Fourth round
The draw for this round took place on 17 September 2019. A total of 24 teams were involved in the Round 4 draw: The 12 2019−20 Super League 2 teams entering in this round, and the twelve winners of the previous round.
12 single-match fixtures were determined, of which the winners qualified to the next Round. The majority of fixtures were held on 24, 25 and 26 September.

Summary

|colspan="3" style="background-color:#D0D0D0" align=center|24 September 2019

|-
|colspan="3" style="background-color:#D0D0D0" align=center|25 September 2019

|-
|colspan="3" style="background-color:#D0D0D0" align=center|26 September 2019

|-
|colspan="3" style="background-color:#D0D0D0" align=center|2 October 2019

|-
|colspan="3" style="background-color:#D0D0D0" align="center" |9 October 2019

|-
|colspan="3" style="background-color:#D0D0D0" align="center" |23 October 2019

|-
|colspan="3" style="background-color:#D0D0D0" align=center|N/A

|}

Matches

Fifth round
The draw for this round took place on 16 October 2019. A total of 22 teams are involved in the Round 5 draw: The 8 2019−20 Super League teams, who finished in places 6–13 in the 2018−19 season entering the competition in this round, the twelve winners of the previous round, the champion of the 2018–19 Football League (Volos), and the single club advancing on walkover in Round 4 (Panserraikos).

As of this phase onward, teams play against each other over two legs on a home-and-away basis, except for the one-match final.

In the draw for Round 5, the nine Super League teams are seeded, and the 13 clubs advancing from previous Rounds are unseeded. The seeded teams are drawn against the unseeded teams, with the seeded teams hosting the second leg. The remaining 4 unseeded clubs will be drawn against one another with the team being drawn last hosting the second leg.

A total of 11 fixtures were determined, of which the winners will qualify to the Round of 16. The first leg matches will be held on 29, 30 and 31 October, while the 2nd leg matches will be held 3, 4 and 5 December 2019.

Seeding

Summary

|}

Matches

Xanthi won 4–2 on aggregate.

Volos won 4–2 on penalties.

PAS Giannina won 3–1 on aggregate.

Panionios won 9–0 on aggregate.

Kalamata won 3–1 on aggregate.

OFI won 4–2 on aggregate.

Asteras Tripolis won 4–2 on aggregate.

Panetolikos won 9–1 on aggregate.

Lamia won 6–0 on aggregate.

Trikala won 4–2 on aggregate.

Knockout phase
Each tie in the knockout phase, apart from the final, was played over two legs, with each team playing one leg at home. The team that scored more goals on aggregate over the two legs advanced to the next round. If the aggregate score was level, the away goals rule was applied, i.e. the team that scored more goals away from home over the two legs advanced. If away goals were also equal, then extra time was played. The away goals rule was again applied after extra time, i.e. if there were goals scored during extra time and the aggregate score was still level, the visiting team advanced by virtue of more away goals scored. If no goals were scored during extra time, the winners were decided by a penalty shoot-out. In the final, which were played as a single match, if the score was level at the end of normal time, extra time was played, followed by a penalty shoot-out if the score was still level.The mechanism of the draws for each round is as follows:
In the draw for the Round of 16, the five Super League clubs finishing in places 1–5 in the previous season are seeded, while the clubs advancing from the Fifth Round are unseeded.The seeded teams are drawn against the unseeded teams, with the seeded teams hosting the second leg. The remaining 6 unseeded clubs will be drawn against one another with the team being drawn last hosting the second leg.
In the draws for the quarter-finals onwards, there are no seedings and teams from the same group can be drawn against each other.

Bracket

Round of 16
The draw took place on 16 December 2019.

Seeding

Summary

|}

Matches

Atromitos won 3–2 on aggregate.

Panathinaikos won 3–1 on aggregate.

AEK Athens won 3–1 on aggregate.

Olympiacos won 6–1 on aggregate.

PAOK won 7–1 on aggregate.

Lamia won 2–1 on aggregate.

Aris won 3–1 on aggregate.

Panetolikos won on away goals.

Quarter-finals
The draw took place on 23 January 2020.

Summary

|}

Matches

Aris won 1–0 on aggregate.

AEK Athens won 5–1 on aggregate.

PAOK won 3–0 on aggregate.

Olympiacos won 3–2 on aggregate.

Semi-finals
The draw took place on 20 February 2020.

Summary

|}

Matches

Olympiacos won 4–3 on aggregate.

AEK Athens won 4–3 on aggregate.

Final

References

External links
The 2019–20 Greek Cup format (in Greek)

Cup
Greek Football Cup seasons
Greece
Greek Cup